Ukwa is a Nigerian dish eaten by the Igbo people of the south-Eastern region. It can be eaten fresh or prepared as a porridge.

Overview 
Ukwa, also known as breadfruit, is commonly cooked with potash, bitter leaf, dry fish, pepper, and spices. You can also cook and add White Puna yam and corn to give a unique taste. Its scientific name is Treculia africana, and it belongs to the family of Moraceae.  The first step to cooking ukwa is to wash it thoroughly. Cook until the seed mash then add palm oil, bitter leaf, Potash, stock or dry fish  and pepper.

Allow to seam for five minutes and serve the breadfruit porridge with drinks such as juice. Freshly cooked ukwa can also be eaten with  palm kernel or coconut.

Similar foods 
Ukwa is very similar to beans in term of preparation and nutritious value, other foods of breadfruit family include mulberries, figs, breadnut, and jackfruit.

See also 
 Trecullia africana
 Staple food
 Niuean cuisine

References 

Igbo cuisine
Nigerian cuisine